Hide and Seek  is a South Korean television series starring Lee Yu-ri, Song Chang-eui, Uhm Hyun-kyung and Kim Young-min. The series aired every Saturday from August 25 to November 17, 2018 on MBC TV from 8:45 p.m. to 11:10 p.m. (KST). It had 4 episodes a day.

Synopsis
The tangled fates of the heiress of a cosmetics company and a woman who had to achieve everything on her own.

Cast

Main 
 Lee Yu-ri as Min Chae-rin
 Jo Ye-rin as young Chae-rin
 A sly and strong-willed executive director of a cosmetics company but deep inside she craves love from her family.
 Song Chang-eui as Cha Eun-hyuk
 Choi Seung-hoon as young Eun-hyuk
 A secretary and driver for Taesan Group.
 Uhm Hyun-kyung as Ha Yeon-joo / Min Soo-a
 Shin Rin-ah as young Soo-a
 An employee for Make Pacific. She is kind-hearted but jealousy will turn her into an evil and spiteful woman.
 Kim Young-min as Moon Jae-sang
 A playboy who is the successor of Taesan Group.

Supporting
 Jung Hye-sun as Na Hae-geum
 Yoon Joo-sang as Moon Tae San
 Lee Jong-won as Min Joon-sik
 Lee Won-jong as Jo Pil-doo
 Jo Mi-ryung as Park Hae-ran
 Seo Joo-hee as Do Hyun-sook
 Yoon Da-kyung as General Manager Kim
 Kim Hye-ji as Ha Geum-joo
 Choi Hee-jin as Ha Dong-joo
 Ahn Bo-hyun as Baek Do-hoon
 Lee Yong-nyeo as Buddhist Choi

Production
The first script reading took place on June 30, 2018 at MBC Broadcasting Station in Sangam-dong, Seoul, South Korea.

Ratings 
 In the table below,  represent the lowest ratings and  represent the highest ratings.
 NR denotes that the drama did not rank in the top 20 daily programs on that date.
 N/A denotes that the rating is not known.

 No episode aired on September 1 due to coverage of the 2018 Asian Games.

Awards and nominations

Notes

References

External links 
  
 

Korean-language television shows
2018 South Korean television series debuts
MBC TV television dramas
South Korean romance television series
2018 South Korean television series endings